The St. Joseph the Worker Church is a church in Macau, China; It is part of the freguesia of Our Lady of Fatima, in the district Iao Hon. Begun in 1998, it was completed in 1999.

Building 

Inside there are exhibited fourteen oriental icons that represent the main events of Christianity, from Abraham to Pentecost. On the main altar stands a statue of the Holy Family.

This is the main church of the neighborhood and the parish was given from bishop Domingos Lam Ka-tseung to Combonian fathers in 1999.

See also
 Religion in Macau

References

External links 

Roman Catholic churches completed in 1999
Roman Catholic churches in Macau
20th-century Roman Catholic church buildings in China
1999 establishments in Macau